Jan H. van Bemmel (born 17 November 1938) is a Dutch former professor of medical informatics at the Vrije Universiteit Amsterdam and the Erasmus University Rotterdam. He was rector magnificus of the Erasmus University Rotterdam between 2000 and 2003.

Career
Van Bemmel was born in Rotterdam on 17 November 1938. He studied physics at Delft University of Technology, where he obtained a degree in 1963. He subsequently started working for the Medical-Physical Institute of the Netherlands Organisation for Applied Scientific Research (TNO). At the institute he was head of the workgroup of biomedical signalanalysis. Six years later he earned his Doctor title at the faculty of physics and mathematics of the Radboud University Nijmegen. His thesis concerned  challenges of signal processing applied to fetal electrocardiography.

In 1973 Van Bemmel stopped working for TNO and was appointed as professor of medical informatics at the Vrije Universiteit Amsterdam. In 1987 Van Bemmel became professor of medical informatics at the Erasmus University Rotterdam. He served as rector magnificus of the University between 2000 and 2003.

His research has amongst other topics focused on biomedical signal and image analysis, medical information systems and electronic health records. He started his work on the latter during the 1980s and later expanded into the signal and image analytics. The American Medical Informatics Association has called him "instrumental in the development of medical informatics as a discipline". He served as president of the International Medical Informatics Association from 1998 to 2001.

Van Bemmel was elected a member of the Royal Netherlands Academy of Arts and Sciences in 1987. He became a corresponding member of the National Academy of Medicine in 1991.

References

1938 births
Living people
Delft University of Technology alumni
Dutch medical researchers
Academic staff of Erasmus University Rotterdam
Health informaticians
Members of the National Academy of Medicine
Members of the Royal Netherlands Academy of Arts and Sciences
Scientists from Rotterdam
Radboud University Nijmegen alumni
Rectors of universities in the Netherlands
Academic staff of Vrije Universiteit Amsterdam